The Spine Pad (or  "spine protector") was an item of military kit used by the British Army when on service in hot climates. It was a piece of cloth, often quilted, designed to protect the spine from heat from the sun. The effect of the sun on the spine was thought to be dangerous in terms of developing fever and sunstroke. The Imperial War Museum has one.

See also 
 Cholera belt
 Pith helmet

References 

British Army equipment